Cranbury Station is an unincorporated community located within Cranbury Township in Middlesex County, New Jersey, United States. The area immediately around the site of the former railroad station along the Camden and Amboy Railroad contains agricultural businesses and small homes. Hightstown-Cranbury Station Road is the main road through the settlement paralleling the railroad and Station Road (County Route 615) as a major road heading east and west through the area. Modern warehouses line Station Road and the nearby New Jersey Turnpike west of the station while large housing developments are located east of here in Monroe Township.

References

Cranbury, New Jersey
Unincorporated communities in Middlesex County, New Jersey
Unincorporated communities in New Jersey